Phaenaulax nanus is a species of beetle in the family Carabidae, the only species in the genus Phaenaulax.

References

Pterostichinae